SS Dagny may refer to:

, a Danish ship lost in 1920.
, a Finnish cargo ship in service 1951–67.

Ship names